This article presents a list of the historical events and publications of Australian literature during 2010.

Events
26 January – Peter Goldsworthy is awarded a Member (AM) in the General Division in the Australia Day Honours List.
February – The "Australian Book Review" magazine conducted a poll of its readers and announces that Cloudstreet by Tim Winton is Australia's favourite novel.
22 June – Peter Temple wins the Miles Franklin Award for his novel Truth becoming the first crime novel to do so.

Major publications

Literary fiction
 Jon Bauer – Rocks in the Belly
 Carmel Bird – Child of the Twilight
 Ashley Hay – The Body in the Clouds
 Anita Heiss – Manhattan Dreaming
Toni Jordan – Fall Girl
 Amanda Lohrey – Reading Madame Bovary
 Roger McDonald – When Colts Ran
 Fiona McGregor – Indelible Ink
 Monica McInerney – At Home with the Templetons
 D.B.C. Pierre – Lights Out in Wonderland
 Jessica Rudd – Campaign Ruby
 Kim Scott – That Deadman Dance
 Chris Womersley – Bereft

Children's and Young Adult fiction
 Alexandra Adornetto – Halo
 Mem Fox – Let's Count Goats!
 Rebecca James – Beautiful Malice
 Alison Lester – Noni the Pony
Doug MacLeod – The Life of a Teenage Body-Snatcher
 Melina Marchetta – The Piper's Son
 Garth Nix – Lord Sunday
 Markus Zusak – Bridge of Clay

Science Fiction and Fantasy
 Trudi Canavan – The Ambassador's Mission
 Sara Douglass – The Infinity Gate
 Greg Egan – Zendegi
 Fiona McIntosh – King's Wrath
 Juliet Marillier – Seer of Sevenwaters
 Scott Westerfeld – Behemoth
 Sean Williams – The Old Republic: Fatal Alliance

Crime and Mystery

 John Birmingham – After America
 Honey Brown – The Good Daughter
 Peter Corris – Torn Apart
 Garry Disher – Wyatt
 Kathryn Fox – Death Mask
 Kerry Greenwood – Dead Man's Chest: A Phryne Fisher Mystery
 Katherine Howell – Cold Justice
 Adrian Hyland – Gunshot Road
 Colleen McCullough – Naked Cruelty
 Geoff McGeachin – The Diggers Rest Hotel
 Tara Moss – The Blood Countess
 Malla Nunn – Let the Dead Men Lie
 Leigh Redhead – Thrill City
 Michael Robotham – Bleed for Me
 Angela Savage – The Half-Child
 David Whish-Wilson – Line of Sight

Poetry
 Christopher Kelen – The Whole Forest Dancing: Poems on Four Legs in the Morning
 Les Murray – Taller When Prone
 Dorothy Porter – Love Poems
 Peter Porter – The Rest on the Flight: Selected Poems
 Thomas Shapcott – Parts of Us
 John Tranter – Starlight: 150 Poems
 Mark Tredinnick – Fire Diary

Biography
 Blanche d'Alpuget – Hawke: The Prime Minister
 Jeff Apter – Together Alone: The Story of the Finn Brothers
 Jim Davidson – A Three Cornered Life: The Historian W.K. Hancock
 Malcolm Fraser & Margaret Simons – Malcolm Fraser: The Political Memoirs
 Rob Mundle – Bligh: Master Mariner
 Anne Pender – One Man Show: The Stages of Barry Humphries
 Mark Logue & Peter Conradi – The King's Speech: How One Man Saved the British Monarchy

Awards and honours

Lifetime achievement

Fiction

International

National

Children and Young Adult

National

Crime and Mystery

National

Science Fiction

Non-Fiction

Poetry

Drama

Deaths
 15 March – Patricia Wrightson, author (born 1921)
 23 April – Peter Porter, author (born 1929)
 29 May – Randolph Stow, author (born 1935)
 9 July – Jessica Anderson, author (born 1916)
 19 July – Jon Cleary, author (born 1917)
 6 October – David Rowbotham, author (born 1924)
 14 November – Bobbi Sykes, poet and author (born 1943)
 14 December – Ruth Park, author (born 1917)

See also
 Literature
 List of years in Australian literature
 List of Australian literary awards
 2010 in Australia
 2010 in literature
 2010 in poetry

References

Literature
Australian literature by year
21st-century Australian literature
2010 in literature